Some Like It Cold (also known as We Like It Cold) is a 1960 Italian war-comedy film directed by Steno.

Cast 
 Ugo Tognazzi: Ugo Bevilacqua 
 Raimondo Vianello: Count Raimondo 
 Yvonne Furneaux: Rosalina 
 Francis Blanche: Von Krussendorf 
 Rik Van Nutter: Captain Callaghan aka "The Cat"
 Peppino De Filippo: Titozzi 
 Loris Gizzi: Biondi 
 Renato Montalbano: Doctor
 Carlo Taranto: Cesarino
 Luisa Mattioli: Laura Biondi
 Fulvia Franco: Luisa
 Brendan Fitzgerald: Lt. Brown
 Cesare Fantoni: Doctor
 Dino Curcio: Vincenzo
 Angela Luce: Ragazza litigiosa 
 Salvo Libassi: Priest
 Piero Pastore: Partisan

References

External links

Some Like It Cold at Variety Distribution

1960 films
Italian comedy films
1960 comedy films
Films directed by Stefano Vanzina
Films scored by Carlo Rustichelli
Italian Campaign of World War II films
Macaroni Combat films
1960s Italian-language films
1960s Italian films